seele group GmbH & Co. KG is involved in the design and construction of facades and complex building envelopes made from glass, steel, aluminium, membranes and other materials. It was founded in 1984 by glazier Gerhard Seele and steelwork engineer Siegfried Gossner.

seele offers its building sector and industrial customers services ranging from R&D, individual advice and joint conceptual design right up to the planning, detailed design and construction of their projects. About 1,000 employees work at the seele group's 12 locations around the world.

The company produced facade panes for the Apple Park as well as many Apple Stores.

History
seele GmbH, founded in 1984 and based in Gersthofen near Munich, is the origin of the seele group of companies with global operations. The city of Gersthofen, Bavaria in Germany is the location of the central production plant for unitised façades and an engineering design office with more than 150 staff. Consulting, logistics, site supervision and general project management are among seele's services. Gersthofen is also home to the large R&D department as well as seele's own testing centre.

Structure
seele GmbH is based in Gersthofen, near Munich in Bavaria. It is the origin of the whole seele group of companies with global operations.

References

1984 establishments in Germany
Companies based in Augsburg
Manufacturing companies established in 1984
Structural steel